Galatasaray SK Wheelchair Basketball 2009–2010 season is the 2010–2010 basketball season for Turkish professional basketball club Galatasaray SK.

The club competes in:
IWBF Champions Cup :5th place
Turkish Wheelchair Basketball Super League :Winner

2009–10 roster

Squad changes for the 2009–2010 season

In:

Out:

Results, schedules and standings

Turkish Wheelchair Basketball Super League 2009–10

Regular season
Galatasaray won the superleague.
1st Half

2nd Half

Friendly Game

IWBF Champions Cup
Galatasaray got the 5th place in this tournament.

References

Galatasaray S.K. (wheelchair basketball) seasons
2009–10 in Turkish basketball by club
2009 in wheelchair basketball
2010 in wheelchair basketball
Galatasaray Sports Club 2009–10 season